Whewell Glacier is a narrow, steep glacier that drains the east slopes of Mount Whewell and merges with the lower part of Honeycomb Glacier, in the Admiralty Mountains, Victoria Land. Mapped by United States Geological Survey (USGS) from surveys and U.S. Navy air photos, 1960–64. Named by Advisory Committee on Antarctic Names (US-ACAN) in association with Mount Whewell.

Glaciers of Victoria Land
Borchgrevink Coast